J. I. Richardson was a Baptist Pastor who served as a missionary in India through the Canadian Baptist Ministries.

Richardson came to India in 1945 and after more than a decade and half he was elected President of Convention of Baptist Churches of Northern Circars in 1958  In the continuing year, Richardson was replaced by Rev. A. B. Masilamani.

After a period of missionary service in India, Richardson returned to Canada and in 1961 became Dean of Carey Hall at the University of British Columbia.  In addition to his responsibilities as Dean of Carey Hall, Richardson was also Chaplain to the University of British Columbia as well as Lecturer of Oriental Religions.

References

Indian Baptists
Telugu people
People from East Godavari district
Christian clergy from Andhra Pradesh
McMaster University alumni
Union Theological Seminary (New York City) alumni
Academic staff of the University of British Columbia
Academic staff of the Senate of Serampore College (University)
Convention of Baptist Churches of Northern Circars
Canadian Baptist Ministries missionaries in India
Canadian Baptist Ministries
Year of birth missing
Year of death missing